An Astronomer is an oil on canvas painting by Dutch artist Ferdinand Bol, created in 1652. He was a student of Rembrandt. It is now in the National Gallery, London, to which it was donated by E.A.Bennett in 1862.

It shows an astronomer at a table, on which are terrestrial and celestial globes on the table. The work also draws on the themes of Melencolia I, an engraving by Albrecht Dürer.

References

Works about astronomy
1652 paintings
Paintings by Ferdinand Bol
Collections of the National Gallery, London